Tiburón Golf Club is a golf club located in Naples, Florida. It has two courses, Gold and Black, both designed by Greg Norman, twice the winner of the Open Championship and formerly the top-ranked player in the world. From Australia, Norman's nickname on the PGA Tour was the "Great White Shark", and tiburón is the Spanish word for shark.

The Gold Course hosts the annual QBE Shootout (formerly Franklin Templeton Shootout), originally the "Shark Shootout", an off-season golf event hosted by Norman that includes members of the PGA Tour and PGA Tour Champions. The tournament debuted in California in 1989 and moved to Tiburón in 2001.

Since 2013, the Gold Course has also hosted the season-ending event of the LPGA Tour, the CME Group Tour Championship, held in November.

The Black Course hosts the Chubb Classic, a Champions Tour Event held in February.

History
The Gold Course opened  in 1998 and the Black in 2001.  Tiburón is designated as a Certified Audubon Cooperative Sanctuary by Audubon International.  In 2006, the club was the first to use customized Segway golf carts.

The golf club is part of a gated golf community by the same name. The Ritz-Carlton Golf Resort, Naples, is also located on the property. The club is also home to the Tiburón Golf Academy , which features private lessons, multi-day golf schools, junior camps, and clubfitting.

Courses

Gold
Championship tees

Rating = 76.0, Slope = 137
Source:

Black
Championship tees

Rating = 74.0, Slope = 145
Source:

Amenities
Sydney's Pub
Spa
Fitness center
Beach transportation
Club concierge

References

External links

QBE Shootout
CME Group Tour Championship

Golf clubs and courses in Florida
Buildings and structures in Naples, Florida
1998 establishments in Florida